The 76th All-Japan Artistic Gymnastics Championships will be held in three separate events. The individual all-around took place from 21-24 April, which is to be followed by the apparatus finals on 18-19 June, and the team all-around has not yet been scheduled.

After two years of being hosted by Takasaki, the competitions for individual events have returned to Shibuya, Tokyo at the Tokyo Metropolitan Gymnasium. Results from tournaments will served as selection for the men's & women's national team competing at the World Championships, Asian Games, and the Summer Universiade.

Qualification

Schedule

Participation

Medal summary

Men

Women

See also 
 2022 in artistic gymnastics
 2022 in Japanese artistic gymnastics
 Japan men's national gymnastics team

References

External links 

National artistic gymnastics competitions
2022 in Japanese sport
Gymnastics in Japan
Artistic
Artistic gymnastics
Gymnastics by year
2022 sport-related lists
March 2022 sports events in Japan
April 2022 sports events in Japan
May 2022 sports events in Japan
June 2022 sports events in Japan
Gymnastics competitions in Japan